"The Flying Lip Lock" is a live single by Ted Nugent from his second live album Intensities in 10 Cities.

Chart positions

1981 singles
Ted Nugent songs
Songs written by Ted Nugent
1981 songs